Jacques Favre (6 May 1921 – 8 May 2008) is a former French football (soccer) player in goalkeeper role and manager. He was born in Laon, Aisne.

He played for Reims, Nice and FC Nancy.

He coached FC Nancy, Metz, Gent, Roubaix-Tourcoing, Angoulême, AS Nancy and Boulogne.

References and notes

External links
 Profile at the official web site of FC Metz

1921 births
2008 deaths
People from Laon
French footballers
Stade de Reims players
OGC Nice players
FC Nancy players
Ligue 1 players
French football managers
FC Metz managers
Angoulême Charente FC managers
K.A.A. Gent managers
US Boulogne managers
CO Roubaix-Tourcoing managers
Association football goalkeepers
Sportspeople from Aisne
Footballers from Hauts-de-France
French expatriate sportspeople in Belgium
French expatriate football managers
Expatriate football managers in Belgium